Gymnotus tiquie is an electric knifefish found in the Tiquié River, a tributary of the Vaupés River in the upper Negro basin, Amazonas, Brazil. It is sympatric with both G. carapo and G. coropinae. Like the rest of its genus, it is exclusively a freshwater fish. It generates a weak electric field used for both navigation and communication.

It possesses a distinct color pattern of dark, oblique bands divided into pairs. G. cataniapo is the most similar-looking species, with both fish sharing several characteristics.

References

External links

Fish described in 2011
Fish of Brazil
Gymnotidae
Weakly electric fish